Basque Country may refer to:
 Basque Country (autonomous community), as used in Spain, also called , an autonomous community of Spain (shown in pink on the map)
 French Basque Country or Northern Basque Country, as used in France, the three (historic) northern provinces in France (shown in yellow on the map)
 Basque Country (greater region), frequently called with its basque name , the concept of a cultural area of the Basque people, culture and language
 Southern Basque Country ( or ), the Basque provinces in Spain i.e. the autonomous community of the Basque Country plus the Foral community of Navarre (shown in pink and green on the map)

See also

 Basque (disambiguation)